is a railway station on the Iiyama Line, East Japan Railway Company (JR East), in Toyono-Asano in the city of Nagano, Nagano Prefecture, Japan.

Lines
Shinano-Asano Station is served by the Iiyama Line, and is 2.2 kilometers from the starting point of the line at Toyono Station.

Station layout
The station consists of one side platform serving a single bi-directional track. The station formerly had an island platform with a side platform for freight. The station is staffed.

History
It was renamed to its present name on 1 June 1944 with the nationalization of the Iiyama Railway. With the privatization of Japanese National Railways (JNR) on 1 April 1987, the station came under the control of JR East.

Passenger statistics
In fiscal 2017, the station was used by an average of 158 passengers daily (boarding passengers only).

Surrounding area
The station is located in a rural area, surrounded by apple orchards.
Asano Post Office

See also
 List of railway stations in Japan

References

External links

 JR East station information 

Railway stations in Nagano (city)
Iiyama Line
Railway stations in Japan opened in 1921